Var C may refer to:
 Variable c, variable speed of light
 variable declaration of "c" in computer programming
 C variable types and declarations
 M33 Var C, see List of most luminous stars